Jacqueline Osherow (born 1956) is an American poet, and Distinguished Professor at the University of Utah.

Biography
Raised in Philadelphia, Jacqueline Osherow graduated from Radcliffe College with a BA magna cum laude, and from Princeton University with a PhD. At Harvard, she was part of the Harvard Lampoon.  Her specialty is love poetry and Biblical poetry and she has been featured in Best American Poetry. 

Writing in a 1999 article for the Poetry Society of America, Osherow said, “If I write out of a specific poetic tradition, it is the Jewish poetic tradition, American poet though I am.”  Her work has appeared in The New Criterion, The Jewish Daily Forward, The Yale Review, and many other journals and quarterlies.  Additionally, she has been anthologized in Twentieth Century American Poetry (2003), The Wadsworth Anthology of Poetry (2005), Jewish American Literature: A Norton Anthology (2000), and The Penguin Book of the Sonnet (2001), and has twice been included in Best American Poetry.

Awards
1990 Witter Bynner Poetry Prize
1997 Guggenheim Fellowship
1999 National Endowment for the Arts Fellowship
Ingram Merrill Foundation fellowship

Works

Poetry collections
Looking for Angels in New York, University of Georgia Press, 1988, 
Conversations with Survivors, University of Georgia Press, 1994,

Anthologies

Non-fiction

References

External links
"Q & A: American Poetry - Jacqueline Osherow", Poetry Society of America

1956 births
Formalist poets
Radcliffe College alumni
Princeton University alumni
University of Utah faculty
Living people
Writers from Philadelphia
American women poets
National Endowment for the Arts Fellows
American women academics
21st-century American women